The Encyclopedia of Analytical Chemistry is an English-language multi-volume encyclopedia published by John Wiley & Sons.

It is a comprehensive analytical chemistry reference, covering all aspects from theory and instrumentation through applications and techniques. Containing over 600 articles and over 6500 illustrations the 15-volume print edition published in 2000. The encyclopedia has been available online since the end of 2006.

References

External links
 Publisher description of the print version http://eu.wiley.com
 Online Encyclopedia of Analytical Chemistry www.mrw.interscience.wiley.com

Encyclopedias of science
Chemistry books